Chen Qimei (17 January 1878 – 18 May 1916), courtesy name Yingshi (英世) was a Chinese revolutionary activist and key figure of Green Gang, close political ally of Sun Yat-sen, and early mentor of Chiang Kai-shek. He was as one of the founders of the Republic of China, and the uncle of Chen Guofu and Chen Lifu.

Born in Wuxing, Zhejiang, China, he went to Japan for studies in 1906, and there joined the Chinese Tongmenghui. Befriended by fellow Zhejiang native Chiang Kai-shek, in 1908, Chen brought Chiang into the Tongmenghui.

In 1911, after the Wuchang Uprising, Chen's forces occupied Shanghai. He was then made military governor of the region. He fled to Japan with Sun Yat-sen upon the failure of the revolution against Yuan Shikai's dictatorship. They subsequently formed the Chinese Revolutionary Party, which later became the Kuomintang, or the Chinese Nationalist Party. As he was returning to Shanghai for another round of revolution, Yuan had him assassinated on May 18, 1916. The assassination was believed to have been carried out by Zhang Zongchang, a general loyal to Yuan.

Chen is perceived as one of the early revolutionary heroes and one of the founding fathers of the Republic of China. He was also the eldest member of which later came to be known as the Chen Family, one of the four most powerful and influential families at the time. The university which had been originally named after him has become a part of today's Fudan University and Zhejiang University after the Chinese Civil War. A monument of him is located in Huzhou, Zhejiang, China.

See also
Republic of China
Yingshi University

References

This article incorporates text from "Chen Qimei", Rulers.org.

1878 births
1916 deaths
Chinese revolutionaries
People of the 1911 Revolution
Assassinated Chinese people
People murdered in China
Members of the Kuomintang
Tongmenghui members